Philenora malthaca is a moth of the subfamily Arctiinae first described by Turner in 1944. It is known in Australia from the south-east coastal regions of New South Wales. There is a single record from Dromana in Victoria.

References

Lithosiini